Roger Nash Baldwin (January 21, 1884 – August 26, 1981) was one of the founders of the American Civil Liberties Union (ACLU). He served as executive director of the ACLU until 1950.

Many of the ACLU's original landmark cases took place under his direction, including the Scopes Trial, the Sacco and Vanzetti murder trial, and its challenge to the ban on James Joyce's Ulysses. Baldwin was a well-known pacifist and author.

Life and work

Early years
Baldwin was born in Wellesley, Massachusetts, the son of Lucy Cushing (Nash) and Frank Fenno Baldwin. He earned his bachelor's and master's degrees at Harvard University; afterwards, he moved to St. Louis on the advice of Louis D. Brandeis. There he taught sociology at Washington University in St. Louis, worked as a social worker and became chief probation officer of the St. Louis Juvenile Court. He also co-wrote Juvenile Courts and Probation with Bernard Flexner at this time; this book became very influential in its era, and was, in part, the foundation of Baldwin's national reputation.

Career

Baldwin was a member of the American Union Against Militarism (AUAM), which opposed American involvement in World War I. After the passage of the Selective Service Act of 1917, Baldwin called for the AUAM to create a legal division to protect the rights of conscientious objectors. On July 1, 1917, the AUAM created the Civil Liberties Bureau (CLB), headed by Baldwin. The CLB separated from the AUAM on October 1, 1917, renaming itself the National Civil Liberties Bureau, with Baldwin as director. In 1920, NCLB was renamed the American Civil Liberties Union. with Baldwin continuing as the ACLU's first executive director.

In the meantime, on 30 October 1918, as a conscientious objector himself, refusing even to register for the draft, undergo medical examination, or accept any alternative service such as farming, was sentenced at the Federal Court in New York City to a year in a penitentiary.

As director of ACLU, Baldwin was integral to the shape of the association's early character; it was under Baldwin's leadership that the ACLU undertook some of its most famous cases, including the Scopes Trial, the Sacco and Vanzetti murder trial, and its challenge to the ban on James Joyce's Ulysses.  Baldwin retired from the ACLU leadership in 1950. He remained active in politics for the rest of his life; for example, he co-founded the International League for the Rights of Man, which is now known as the International League for Human Rights.

In St. Louis, Baldwin had been greatly influenced by the  radical social movement of the anarchist Emma Goldman. He joined the Industrial Workers of the World. Roger Baldwin oversaw, documented and supplied funding for a large number of defense cases for I.W.W. members and investigations throughout the United States. A fully accessible archive of his correspondence with I.W.W branches, investigators and attorneys has been published by Princeton's Mudd Manuscript Library.

In 1927, he had visited the Soviet Union and wrote a book, Liberty Under the Soviets. Later, however, as more and more information came out about Joseph Stalin's regime in the Soviet Union, Baldwin became more and more disillusioned with communism and in 1953 called it "A NEW SLAVERY" (capitalized in the original). He condemned "the inhuman communist police state tyranny, forced labor." In the 1940s, Baldwin led the campaign to purge the ACLU of Communist Party members.

In 1947, General Douglas MacArthur invited him to Japan to foster the growth of civil liberties in that country. In Japan, he founded the Japan Civil Liberties Union, and the Japanese government awarded him the Order of the Rising Sun. In 1948, Germany and Austria invited him for similar purposes. He was elected a Fellow of the American Academy of Arts and Sciences in 1951.

Later years
In 1968, Washington University awarded Baldwin an honorary doctorate of Laws degree.

President Jimmy Carter awarded Baldwin the Medal of Freedom on January 16, 1981.

Death and legacy

A resident of Oakland, New Jersey, Baldwin died of heart failure on August 26, 1981, at The Valley Hospital in Ridgewood, New Jersey.

He is the subject of John G. Avildsen's 1982 documentary Traveling Hopefully.

See also

 International Labor Defense
 Workers Defense Union

References

Works

Books and pamphlets
 Juvenile Courts and Probation. With Bernard Flexner. New York: The Century Company, 1914.
 Liberty Under the Soviets. New York: Vanguard Press, 1928.
 Civil Liberties and Industrial Conflict. With Clarence B. Randall. Cambridge, MA: Harvard University Press, 1938.
 The Rights of Man are Worth Defending. With Pauli Murray. New York: League For Adult Education, 1942.
 Democracy in Trade Unions: A Survey, with a Program of Action. New York, American Civil Liberties Union, 1943.
 Human Rights: World Declaration and American Practice New York, Public Affairs Committee, 1950.
 A New Slavery: Forced Labor: The Communist Betrayal of Human Rights. New York, Oceana Publications, 1953.

Articles
 "Freedom in the USA and the USSR," New York: Soviet Russia Today, 1934.
  "Liberalism and the United Front," in Irving Talmadge (ed.), Whose revolution? A Study of the Future Course of Liberalism in the United States, edited by Irving Talmadge New York: Howell, Soskin, 1941.
 "The Making of a Reformer: The Roger Baldwin Story: A Prejudiced Account by Himself," in Woody Klein, Liberties Lost: The Endangered Legacy of the ACLU. Westport, CT: Praeger Publishers, 2006.

Books edited

 Peter Kropotkin, Revolutionary Pamphlets: A Collection of Writings. New York: Vanguard Press, 1927.

Further reading

 Robert C. Cottrell, Roger Nash Baldwin and the American Civil Liberties Union. New York: Columbia University Press, 2001.
 Peggy Lamson, Roger Baldwin: Founder of the American Civil Liberties Union. Boston: Houghton Mifflin, 1976.
 The Individual and the State: The Problem as Presented by the Sentencing of Roger N. Baldwin. New York: Graphic Press, 1918.

External links
Roger Nash Baldwin Papers: Finding Aid, Seeley G. Mudd Manuscript Library, Princeton University, Princeton, NJ.
 Robert C. Cottrell, "Roger Nash Baldwin, Unitarian." Harvard Square Library.

Roger Baldwin, ACLU Founder at 93 Years Old, A Film by Tom Chamberlin
Post-War World Council Records from Swarthmore College Peace Collection

1884 births
1981 deaths
Activists for African-American civil rights
American anti-war activists
American anti-communists
American conscientious objectors
American pacifists
Fellows of the American Academy of Arts and Sciences
American Civil Liberties Union people
Harvard University alumni
Industrial Workers of the World members
People from Mahwah, New Jersey
People from Oakland, New Jersey
People from Wellesley, Massachusetts
Probation and parole officers
Recipients of the Order of the Rising Sun
Washington University in St. Louis faculty
Presidential Medal of Freedom recipients